All Saints RC School is a coeducational Comprehensive Roman Catholic Secondary School and Sixth Form. It has a split site on South Bank and the Scarcroft / City-Centre West area of York. It is regarded as the best Catholic school in the North.

The Upper Site is located between South Bank and Scarcroft Road in the south side of York, England, whereas the Lower Site is Located on Nunnery Lane close to Micklegate Bar.

In 2022, it was announced that All Saints is the best School in York, fifth best School in the North. 

The School has been serving the Catholic population of York and more broadly Yorkshire (in some form) since 1665, and plays a role in the Catholic education of the region as the only Catholic Secondary school and Sixth Form in York.

Admissions
All Saints is a secondary school and sixth form (being the single largest Roman Catholic school in the region) for children from the York and Yorkshire Catholic Parishes, however welcomes students from other faiths and belief backgrounds.

History

Founding 

Mary Ward, a nun from York, initiated a mission in 1665 to educate girls in the Catholic faith, with the aim of preserving Catholicism for future generations. She assumed leadership of the community and established convent-run schools on the Continent, where Catholicism was still legal. Following her passing, the Sisterhood returned to York in 1686. With the assistance of Thomas Gascoigne, a Yorkshire businessman who desired his daughters to receive a local Catholic education, the Bar Convent Girls School was founded. Gascoigne provided a £500 donation for the upkeep of those who would dedicate themselves to nurturing children in piety and learning. The school eventually became the first Roman Catholic institution to teach girls in the nation. 'no more than a boarding school for young ladies of Roman Catholic families'. 

- Drake describing the Convent and school in 1736During the 1800s, an additional wing was added for a day school, as the school was burgeoning in popularity.

In 1925, the Bar Convent School became a grammar school, allowing locals to apply for scholarships.

Second World War 
During the Baedeker raids in 1942, the school infirmary was demolished. At the time, the school was being utilized as a military hospital, and medical equipment was installed in the school hall. Following the conclusion of the Second World War, the school's facilities were expanded, and an additional seven classrooms, a laboratory, a needlework room, and a dining room were constructed, effectively doubling the school's accommodation.

Comprehensive Education 
During the mid-1970s, the school began admitting boys. Following the elimination of the grammar school system in the early 1980s, the responsibility for the school was transferred from the Sisterhood to the Diocese of Middlesbrough, ensuring the continuation of free Catholic education in the region. The school was reopened as All Saints Roman Catholic School in 1985, with the inclusion of pupils from St. Georges and Margaret Clitherow Secondary Schools (due to the Vale of York Catholic School re-structuring), resulting in a doubling of the school's size. Additionally, the Upper School and Sixth Form were relocated to Mill Mount, a neighboring converted Manor House property obtained by the school from the council after the closure of the Mill Mount County Grammar School for Girls.

Mill Mount County Grammar School For Girls 
The school was established in 1920 and was initially administered by the City of York Education Committee until 1974 when it was taken over by North Yorkshire County Council. The school had 124 girls enrolled in March 1921, some of whom were transferred from Queen Anne School. The original building, which was built in 1850 for Charles Heneage Elsley Esq., J.P. and Recorder of York, was purchased and adapted by the municipal authority for use as a school.

The school quickly expanded and added a chemistry laboratory in 1922 and a cookery centre in 1925. By 1933, there were 272 girls enrolled, and extensions were added in 1935 to provide accommodation for 150 more girls. A games field at Nunthorpe was opened in 1938. By March 1946, there were 383 girls attending the school. The curriculum was expanded over the years, with subjects such as chemistry, general science, and physics being added, and the original School Certificate being replaced with General Certificate of Education (GCEs).

In 1965, a plan was proposed to turn York into a comprehensive education system by 1970, with Nunthorpe and Mill Mount joining to become a sixth form college, and the two other grammar schools becoming a comprehensive. However, this plan fell through, and the school remained a girls' grammar school until 1985, and the site was sold to All Saints RC .

In 1985, a book was published titled "The Last Windmill," written by two of the school's headmistresses and with contributions from students, to mark the end of Mill Mount's existence as a school in its own right.

Headteachers 
Dr. Adrian Elliott served as the first headteacher of the school until 2003, after which William Scriven took over and held the position for 15 years. In 2018, Scriven departed, and the current headteacher succeeded him.

Present day 

At present, the Bar Convent serves as a museum, guest house, and café. The Mary Ward sisters and Sacristan reside in the Convent, and the Lower School shares the chapel.

Specialist Schools Programme
All Saints School was formerly a Language and Performing Arts College which was part of the Specialist schools programme. This meant that it received extra funding for language teaching. It no longer holds this title as the programme was abolished.

Building relocation/modernisation 
	
Since its establishment in its current form, All Saints has operated a split-site school, which as (then Headteacher) Mr William Scriven described in 2013:“Running a split-site school costs us about £300,000 extra a year, and we get a £137,000 split site allowance from the council with the rest of the money coming from our budget. If we were in one building we would be able to avoid a lot of the current duplication of costs.”Therefore the school has long sought to relocate to meet the demands of its growing student body as the largest Catholic school in Yorkshire, however this posed a specific challenge as the site would need to be in close proximity to the rail station and other transport connections to facilitate the catholic community from outside the York area to be able to commute into the school, this eventually became the reason for a failure for the bid of a £20 million new school in 2013.

In March 2022 the debate about whether the school buildings are fit for use and large enough was reignited due to the government announcing the School Rebuilding Programme, local MP Rachael Maskell, raised the safety and wellbeing of the school buildings for the student body in the house of commons stating: “Parts of the school date back over 300 years. I have had the tour with the estates team at the school; it is taking ever more of their time just to try to keep the site safe, which is a major challenge."The member of parliament for York Central also discussed the nature of the Mill Mount location as of note in the bid to rebuild the school:“Needless to say, the behaviour of inebriated racegoers poses a risk, as they urinate on their way back to the city through the school premises (...) need to be taken into account in the programme for rebuilding schools

Attainment

In 2022, 70% of pupils achieved a pass at grade 5 or above in GCSE English and Maths, and 84 percent a standard pass in both. The school's Progress 8 benchmark at GCSE was 0.67, compared to 0.26 in York as a whole and -0.03 nationally. 27% of children were entered for the English Baccalaureate, compared to 41% in York and 39% nationally.

Almost 50% of the sixth forms' A level grades were at A* or A, significantly higher than national averages. The average grade was B+, compared to B in York as a whole and nationally.

In November 2022, the school achieved the fifth position amongst state schools in the North, as ranked in  Parent Power, The Sunday Times Schools Guide 2023. It also secured the first place in the northern comprehensive School, northern Catholic School and York Secondary School categories.

Alumni
Due to All Saints being a merger of multiple schools and buildings, alumni are very difficult to trace:

St Georges RC Senior School
Incorporated into All Saints in 1985 during the reform of Catholic education in the Vale of York.
 David Bradley, actor. Best known for playing Argus Filch in the Harry Potter film series and Walder Frey in the HBO series Game of Thrones.

Mill Mount County Grammar School for Girls
This school was incorporated into Millthorpe school but was situated in All Saints upper site.
 Sue Doughty (née Powell), former Liberal Democrat MP for Guildford (1959–66)
Karen Jones CBE, businessperson and founder of the Café Rouge restaurant chain

Bar Convent Grammar School
 Isobel McDonald-Davies, Deputy Registrar General for England and Wales from 1994-2005
 Tricia Walker, author

All Saints RC School
 Anna Docherty, four times British champion, Team GB track cyclist

See also
 List of direct grant grammar schools

References

External links
 
 Bar Convent

Catholic secondary schools in the Diocese of Middlesbrough
Secondary schools in York
Voluntary aided schools in Yorkshire